Myoxocephalus brandtii, the snowy sculpin, is a species of marine ray-finned fish belonging to the family Cottidae, the typical sculpins. This species is found in the northwest Pacific, with a range extending from the Sea of Okhotsk to Hokkaido and the Sea of Japan.

Myoxocephalus brandtii was first formally described in 1867 as Cottus brandtii by the Austrian ichthyologist Franz Steindachner with its type locality given as the mouth of the Amur in Russia. 

Lepeophtheirus elegans is a species of sea lice reported on M. brandtii.

References

External links
 Myoxocephalus brandtii at the Encyclopedia of Life

brandtii
Fish described in 1867
Fish of Japan